Aimaq or Aimaqi is the dominant eastern Persian ethnolect spoken by the Aimaq people in central northwest Afghanistan (west of the Hazarajat) and eastern Iran. It is close to the Dari varieties of Persian. The Aimaq people are thought to have a 5–15% literacy rate.

Dialects 
Subdialects of Aimaq dialect include:

 Changezi
 Firozkohi
 Jamshidi or Jamshedi (also known as Djamchidi, Yemchidi, or Dzhemshid)
 Maliki
 Mizmast
 Taimani
 Timuri or Taimuri
 Zainal
 Zohri (also known as Zuri)

Phonology
Phonetically, as one of the eastern Persian dialects, the Aimaq dialect resembles a formal or classical form of Persian.

Vowels:

 The "majhul" vowels ē / ī and ō / ū are still kept separate, whereas in western Persian they are merged as ī and ū respectively. For instance, the identically written words شیر  'lion' and 'milk' are in western Persian both pronounced [šīr], but in Aimaq [šēr] for 'lion' and [šīr] for 'milk'. The long vowel in زود 'quick' and زور 'strong' is realized as [ū] in western Persian, in contrast, these words are pronounced as [zūd] and [zōr] respectively by Aimaq speakers.
 The high short vowels [i] and [u] tend to be lowered in western Persian to [e] and [o].

Consonants:

 Aimaq still retains the (classical) bilabial pronunciation  of the labial consonant و, which is realized as a voiced labiodental fricative  in western Persian.  is found in Aimaq as an allophone of f before voiced consonants.
 The voiced uvular stop  (ق) and voiced velar fricative  (غ) are still kept separate in Aimaq. They have coincided in western Persian (probably under the influence of Turkic languages like Azeri and Turkmen).

See also 

 Hazaragi dialect

References

Footnotes

Notations

 Clifton, John M. (ed.) (2005) Studies in languages of Tajikistan North Eurasia Group, SIL International, St Petersburg, Russia, OCLC 122939499

Eastern Persian dialects in Afghanistan
Languages of Iran
Languages of Tajikistan